Mulham Arufin (born November 17, 1990) is an Indonesian footballer who currently plays for Gresik United in the Indonesia Super League.

References

External links

1990 births
Association football forwards
Living people
Indonesian footballers
Liga 1 (Indonesia) players
Gresik United players